Silvio Schirrmeister (born 7 December 1988, Neubrandenburg) is a German hurdler. At the 2012 Summer Olympics, he competed in the Men's 400 metres hurdles.

References

German male hurdlers
Living people
Olympic athletes of Germany
Athletes (track and field) at the 2012 Summer Olympics
1988 births
People from Neubrandenburg
Sportspeople from Mecklenburg-Western Pomerania